Agostino Panozzi (10 August 1810 - 6 March 1839) was an Italian painter, active in Vicenza.

He was born in Arcugnano in the province of Vicenza. A Communion (or Coronation) of Saint Louis at the Pinacoteca Civica of Bologna is attributed to the painter. He also painted a Death of Archimedes (1832) also in the museums of Vicenza. He studied at the Academy of Fine Arts of Venice from 1828-1831.

He soon paints an altarpiece depicting the Miracle of the Mule (1834) for the Duomo di Cologna Veneta (Verona). Returning to Vicenza in 1835, he aspires to establish a school to teach figure painting. He painted for the Basilica of Monte Berico some canvases now lost. He developed paralysis of the legs, and despite, or due to surgery, died in Padua.

References

1810 births
1839 deaths
People from Vicenza
19th-century Italian painters
Italian male painters
Painters from Vicenza
Italian neoclassical painters
Accademia di Belle Arti di Venezia alumni
19th-century Italian male artists